Summit is the name of some places in the U.S. state of Wisconsin:
Summit, Douglas County, Wisconsin, a town
Summit, Juneau County, Wisconsin, a town
Summit, Langlade County, Wisconsin, a town
Summit, Waukesha County, Wisconsin, a village